Dharmaraja Ratha is a monument in the Pancha Rathas complex at Mahabalipuram, on the Coromandel Coast of the Bay of Bengal, in the Kancheepuram district of the state of Tamil Nadu, India. It is an example of monolith Indian rock-cut architecture. Dating from the late 7th century, it is attributed to the reign of King Mahendravarman I and his son Narasimhavarman I (630–680 AD; also called Mamalla, or "great warrior") of the Pallava Kingdom. The entire complex is under the auspices of the Archaeological Survey of India (ASI). It is one of the Group of Monuments at Mahabalipuram that were designated as a UNESCO World Heritage Site since 1984.

Resembling a chariot (ratha), it is carved out of a single, long stone of pink granite. Though sometimes mistakenly referred to as a temple, the structure was not consecrated because it was not completed following the death of Narasimhavarman I. The structure is named after the eldest of the Pancha Pandavas, of epic Mahabharata fame, though this nomenclature is not supported by its iconography. It is dedicated to Shiva.

Geography
The structure is located at Mahabalipuram (previously known as Mammallapuram) on the Coromandel Coast of the Bay of Bengal in Kancheepuram district.

History

Like the other four Pancha Rathas, Dharmaraja ratha was built from stone, a replica of a wooden version which preceded it. The temple is incomplete.

Architecture

All the Pancha Rathas are aligned in a north–south direction and share a common plinth. They have no precedent in Indian architecture and have proved to be "templates" for building larger temples in the South Indian tradition of Dravidian temple architecture. Though cut out of monolithic rocks, they are carved in the form of structural temples in regular building form and hence termed as "quasimonolithic temple form.

Dharmaraja Ratha is the most prominent architecturally of the five rathas and also the tallest and largest. The ratha faces west and is sculpturally very rich. It has three floors including the ground floor. It is open on all four sides and the facade on all sides are supported by two pillars and two pilasters with the corners forming an integral part of the support system for the upper floors. Carved out from a single rock of pink granite, along with other three rathas on a single block of stone oriented in a north–south direction, it is a trithala or three-story vimana, square in plan, with open porches and a terraced pyramidal tower. and an octagonal shikhara (pinnacle) at the top. Small-sized model shrines called kudus make up the ornament of the upper part of the tower. There are many sculptures on the corners of the sanctum, which depict Shiva; Harihara, Brahma-Sasta, Skanda, Brahma, Ardhanarisvara (half Shiva half Parvati) and Krishna are depicted alongside an inscribed portrait of a king, indicated to be Narasimhavarman I, who commissioned the temple. The shafts of the pillars are supported by seated lions. The second floor contains rich imagery, with further depictions of Shiva as Gangadara and Natesa, and Vishnu resting on Garuda and Kaliya Mardhana.

Inscriptions
On the Dharmaraja Rathas there are 16 inscriptions in Grantha and Nagari scripts in Sanskrit inscriptions on which are royal cognomen, single-word titles, most of them are attributed to Narasimhavarman I. On the top tier of the temple is an inscription which refers to it as Atyantakama Pallavesvaram; Atyantakama was one of the known titles of Paramesvaravarman I. Other inscribed titles for the king are Shri Megha and Trailokiya–vardhana-vidhi.

References

Hindu temples in Mahabalipuram
Pancha Rathas
Archaeological monuments in Tamil Nadu
Dravidian architecture
Pallava architecture